Kim Il (Korean: 김일; Hanja: 金一; February 24, 1929 – October 26, 2006), also known as his ring name Kintarō Ōki (Japanese: 大木金太郎), was a South Korean professional wrestler, and Ssireum (Korean wrestling) player. He spent his wrestling career from the 1950s to the 1980s.

Career
Kim was originally a Ssireum player, but he had hopes of becoming a student of Japanese wrestling legend Rikidōzan, another Korean. He entered Japan illegally in 1958 to do so, but was arrested in 1959. After being released he was able to train with Rikidōzan and joined the Japan Wrestling Association. Kim started to play wrestling under his ring name "Kintaro Ohki" after his debut in November 1959. On September 30, 1960, Ohki defeated fellow rookie Kanji Inoki, later Antonio Inoki, who was making his debut along with Shohei Baba, later Giant Baba. Ohki, Baba and Inoki were considered a part of a rookie trio groomed to become the eventual successors to Rikidōzan himself. Ohki was also trained by Mr. Moto and Yoshinosato.

With Rikidōzan's murder in 1963 Ohki returned to his homeland to raise the profile of professional wrestling there, but returned to the JWA when Toyonobori and Inoki left the promotion, though he returned the next year.  Also in 1967 Ohki became the top star in Korea with his defeat of Mark Lewin to win the Worldwide Wrestling Associates World Heavyweight Championship.  With this the JWA wanted to rename him to Rikidōzan but the plan never went through.

Inoki and Baba famously left the JWA in 1972 to found the All Japan and New Japan promotions in 1972, letting Ohki become the JWA's top star, winning the NWA International Heavyweight Championship.

In April 1973 the JWA closed and was absorbed into All Japan, and though he competed for the new organization for a time he wrestled mostly as a freelancer in Japan and a main event star in South Korea, famously wrestling against his former fellow rookies Inoki and Baba in 1974 and 1975.  He defended the NWA International title in IPW and South Korea until ordered by the NWA to vacate it in 1981.

Since then Ohki did not compete much, with his official retirement card on April 2, 1995, held at a Weekly Pro-Wrestling magazine sponsored show at the Tokyo Dome in Japan. Wrestling legend Lou Thesz assisted Ohki at this, his last public appearance in Japan; Ohki was in a wheelchair at this time.

During his career Ohki also held the Far East Heavyweight title, All Asia Heavyweight and Tag Team title four times each, NWA Texas Tag Team title and NWA International Tag Team title, also four times.

Ohki died in the Eulji General Hospital in Seoul on October 26, 2006, of a heart attack brought on by chronic kidney disease and kidney failure.

Championships and accomplishments
All Japan Pro Wrestling
All Asia Heavyweight Championship (2 times)
NWA International Tag Team Championship (2 times) - with Kim Duk (2) 
Champion Carnival Fighting Spirit Award (1976)
World's Strongest Tag Determination Fair Play Award (1977) – with Kim Duk
World's Strongest Tag Determination Effort Award (1978) – with Kim Duk
World's Strongest Tag Determination Team Play Award (1979) – with Kim Duk
Japan Wrestling Association
All Asia Heavyweight Championship (2 times)
All Asia Tag Team Championship (4 times) – with Michiaki Yoshimura (3) and Antonio Inoki (1)
NWA International Heavyweight Championship (1 time)
NWA International Tag Team Championship (2 times) – Seiji Sakaguchi (1) and Umanosuke Ueda (1)
Korean Wrestling Association
Far East Heavyweight Championship (1 time)
NWA Big Time Wrestling
NWA Texas Tag Team Championship (1 time) – with Pak Song
Tokyo Sports
Fighting Spirit Award (1975)
Service Award (2006)
Western States Sports
NWA Western States Tag Team Championship (1 time) - with Pak Song
Worldwide Wrestling Associates
WWA World Heavyweight Championship (1 time)
WWA World Tag Team Championship (1 time) – with Mr. Moto
WWA International Television Tag Team Championship (1 time) – with Mr. Moto
Wrestling Observer Newsletter
Wrestling Observer Newsletter Hall of Fame (Class of 1996)
Korean Sport & Olympic Committee
Korean Sports Hall of Fame (2018)

References

External links
 Puroresu.com biography
 Puroresu.com forum posting of Korean Times obituary
 

1929 births
2006 deaths
South Korean male professional wrestlers
Japanese male professional wrestlers
Professional wrestling executives
South Korean Buddhists
All Asia Tag Team Champions
NWA Americas Tag Team Champions
20th-century professional wrestlers
NWA International Heavyweight Champions
NWA International Tag Team Champions
All Asia Heavyweight Champions
Gimhae Kim clan
People from Goheung County